Nobody Knows the Trouble I've Been is an album by folk artist "Spider" John Koerner released in 1986. The album was recorded in one evening at Creation Audio studios in Minneapolis, Minnesota.

Reception

In his Allmusic review, music critic Richard Meyer wrote, "Spider John Koerner sings and plays (12-string guitar) with a knowing but commanding casual authority that brings this material to life brilliantly. The music jumps out of the speaker so effortlessly you can appreciate the fun and dark side of these old songs."

Track listing
All songs traditional unless otherwise noted.
 "Cotton-Eyed Joe" – 0:38
 "Sail Away Ladies" – 2:54
 "Acres of Clams" – 4:10
 "Black Dog" – 3:28
 "Froggie Went a-Courtin'" – 4:16
 "The Old Chisholm Trail" – 3:22
 "The Leather-Winged Bat" – 2:12
 "Red Apple Juice" – 3:12
 "Worried Rambler" (John Koerner) –  3:58
 "What's a Matter with the Mill" – 2:29
 "Shenandoah" – 3:02
 "The Roving Gambler" – 2:41
 "St. James Infirmary" (Joe Primrose, traditional) – 3:08
 "Irene" (Lead Belly, Alan Lomax) –  3:00
 "Cotton-Eyed Joe (Reprise)" – 0:42

Personnel
"Spider" John Koerner – guitar, harmonica, vocals
John "Mr. Bones" Burrell – percussion
Tony Glover – harmonica on "The Leather-Winged Bat" and "Red Apple Juice"
Dakota Dave Hull – guitar
Willie Murphy – bass
Peter Ostroushko – mandolin
Chip Taylor Smith – fiddle
Butch Thompson – piano
Production notes
Dakota Dave Hull – producer
Eric Peltoniemi – executive producer
Steve Wiese – engineer
Gregg Vershay – photography
George Ostroushko – artwork, design
Marge Ostroushko – assistant producer
Dan Corrigan – photography
John Hanson – design

References

External links
John Koerner discography

1986 albums
John Koerner albums